The 1959–60 season is the 80th season of competitive football by Rangers.

Overview
Rangers played a total of 56 competitive matches during the 1959–60 season.

Results
All results are written with Rangers' score first.

Scottish First Division

Scottish Cup

League Cup

European Cup

Appearances

See also
 1959–60 in Scottish football
 1959–60 Scottish Cup
 1959–60 Scottish League Cup
 1959–60 European Cup

References 

Rangers F.C. seasons
Rangers